Casino Regina is a casino located on Saskatchewan Drive — (formerly South Railway Street) — in Regina, Saskatchewan, Canada. It operates in the city's former union station, a Tyndall and ashlar stone structure completed in 1912. The casino is owned and operated by Sask Gaming.

History

The Beaux-Arts style Union Station was constructed in 1911-12 and was actually Regina's third train station; the first is now a museum in Broadview, Saskatchewan. The station was completed the same year the deadly "Regina Cyclone" struck the city, tearing through Wascana Park and gutting part of the downtown area.  The building underwent a major expansion in 1931, and the original façade was redone in a simpler Art Deco style with Tyndall stone. As well, terrazzo floors, marble support columns and plaster molded ceilings where added to the interior.

In the early 1990s, cutbacks to rail services throughout Canada lead to the closure of Regina's Union Station.  The Station had been an important part of Regina's history and heritage since its opening in 1912. After the station's closure, its fate remained unknown for several years. Union Station was designated as an official heritage site in 1991.

By 1995, a $37 million construction project began to convert the vacant station into the province's second casino. In 1996, Casino Regina opened.

Description

The building contains old railway police jail cells in the basement that were used for transporting prisoners, and shows evidence of a tunnel representing a system of underground passages said to stretch several blocks east of the casino and south all the way to the stately Hotel Saskatchewan. These tunnels were destroyed during the construction of the Cornwall Centre, a major downtown shopping complex.

Inside, positioned on a wall in the central hall, is a schedule board displaying the arrivals and departures on the day the train station closed back in 1990. The hall itself, formerly the station's main concourse, features a high ceiling with simple chandeliers and a clock near the top of the back wall.

The casino houses some 800 slot machines, 35 table games, and an 8-table poker room. The 800-seat Show Lounge features entertainers, and meals are served in The Union Station and Rail Car restaurants, as well as in the CPR Lounge and VIP Lounge. Regularly scheduled Union Station historic tours are another attraction, as are the nightly LED shows.

Casino Regina is a notable employer in the city, employing 664 people, over fifty percent of whom are Aboriginal.

See also
 List of casinos in Canada

References

External links
 
 Canadian Register of Historic Places
 Luck and Legacy

Art Deco architecture in Canada
Buildings and structures in Regina, Saskatchewan
Casinos in Saskatchewan
Music venues in Saskatchewan
Disused railway stations in Canada
Beaux-Arts architecture in Canada
Union stations in Canada
Tourist attractions in Regina, Saskatchewan